Half of Adur District Council in West Sussex, England is elected every two years. Until 2003, the council was elected by thirds. Since the last boundary changes in 2004, 29 councillors have been elected from 14 wards.

Political control
Since the foundation of the council in 1973 political control of the council has been held by the following parties:

Leadership
The leader of the council since 2000 has been:

Council elections
1973 Adur District Council election
1976 Adur District Council election
1979 Adur District Council election (New ward boundaries)
1980 Adur District Council election
1982 Adur District Council election
1983 Adur District Council election
1984 Adur District Council election
1986 Adur District Council election (District boundary changes took place but the number of seats remained the same)
1987 Adur District Council election
1988 Adur District Council election
1990 Adur District Council election
1991 Adur District Council election
1992 Adur District Council election
1994 Adur District Council election (District boundary changes took place but the number of seats remained the same)
1995 Adur District Council election
1996 Adur District Council election
1998 Adur District Council election
1999 Adur District Council election
2000 Adur District Council election
2002 Adur District Council election
2003 Adur District Council election
2004 Adur District Council election (New ward boundaries reduced the number of seats by 10)
2006 Adur District Council election
2008 Adur District Council election
2010 Adur District Council election
2012 Adur District Council election
2014 Adur District Council election
2016 Adur District Council election
2018 Adur District Council election
2021 Adur District Council election
2022 Adur District Council election

District result maps

By-election results

1997-2001

2001-2005

2005-2009

2009-2013

Paul Graysmark was elected in 2012 for the Conservatives; he resigned to seek re-election as a UKIP candidate.

2014-2018

2019-2023

References

 By-election results

External links
Adur & Worthing Councils

 
Council elections in West Sussex
Local government in West Sussex
Local elections
District council elections in England